This was the first edition of the tournament.

Nam Ji-sung and Song Min-kyu won the title after defeating Gong Maoxin and Zhang Ze 6–3, 3–6, [14–12] in the final.

Seeds

Draw

References

 Main draw

Yokkaichi Challenger - Doubles